Atalan is a town in Düziçi district of Osmaniye Province, Turkey. At  it is situated at the easternmost part of Çukuroca plains . The population of the town is 2029   as of 2011. Up to 1968 Atalan was a remote neighbourhood of Böcekli a town to the north. In 1968 it was declared a village and in 1998 it was declared a seat of township. Main revenues of the town are pistachio and dairying.

References 

Populated places in Osmaniye Province
Towns in Turkey
Düziçi District